Philip Jay Hooper (born 1993) is a politician elected to the Vermont's House of Representatives representing the Orange-Washington-Addison district. Hooper was elected in 2016 and re-elected in 2018 and 2020. When originally elected, he was one of the youngest legislators in Vermont. He is the son of former State Representative and Secretary of State Donald M. Hooper. While the legislature is in session, he hosts a radio show called The Heat of the House on WCVR.

Hooper attended high school at Trinity-Pawling. He graduated from Connecticut College with a double-major in history and government.

References

21st-century American politicians
Living people
People from Brookfield, Vermont
Democratic Party members of the Vermont House of Representatives
1993 births